Justice Avery may refer to:

Edward Avery (judge), associate justice of the Supreme Court of Ohio
Christopher L. Avery, associate justice of the Connecticut Supreme Court
Coleman W. Avery, associate justice of the Supreme Court of Ohio
Alphonso C. Avery, associate justice of the North Carolina Supreme Court